Kallappa Awade is an Indian politician. He was elected to the Lok Sabha, the lower house of the Parliament of India from the Ichalkaranji in Maharashtra as a member of the Indian National Congress.

References

External links
Official biographical sketch in Parliament of India website

Indian National Congress politicians
India MPs 1996–1997
India MPs 1998–1999
Lok Sabha members from Maharashtra
1931 births
Living people